The Brazos Transit District, branded as The District, is the primary provider of mass transportation in a 16-county area of East Texas. The agency was established in 1974 as the Brazos Valley Transit Authority, with the primary purpose of providing fixed routes for Bryan and College Station, plus rural demand response service. Today, two separate urban areas feature fixed routes, Paratransit, Demand and Response plus a series of commuter buses for several Houston suburbs.

Services

Bryan/College Station 
The heart of The District's services, the Bryan–College Station metropolitan area features seven local routes, serving as part of a two-tiered transportation strategy along with bus services provided for students by Texas A&M University.
Blue Route- Transfer Center to Castle Heights
Green Route- Transfer Center to Shadowood/TAMU
Maroon Route- Transfer Center to West Park/TAMU
Orange Route- Transfer Center to Bellevue/Park Forest
Purple Route- Transfer Center to Boonville/Westwood Estates
Red Route- Transfer Center to Central Bryan
Yellow Route- Transfer Center to Regency South/Devonshire

Cleveland 
A city loop is provided in the small city of Cleveland.

Dayton/Liberty 
The interconnected cities of Liberty and Dayton featured a varied fixed route service, which at different times loops through each of the two cities, with occasional services that connect the two municipalities.

Lufkin 
The small industrial city of Lufkin features five local routes, including one that extends to the town of Diboll.
Orange Route- Angelina College to Diboll
Purple Route- Jennings Station to Keltys
Blue Route- Jennings Station to Hospitals
Yellow Route- Jennings Station to Atkinson

Nacogdoches 
The agricultural center of Nacogdoches includes four local routes, three of which provide some form of service to SFA State University.
Blue Route- Transfer Center to Stallings Drive
Green Route- Transfer Center to Fredonia Hill
Red Route- Transfer Center to S.F. Austin University/Parker Road

References

External links 

Bus transportation in Texas
Bryan, Texas
College Station, Texas